Wajah may refer to:

Wajah, Helmand, Afghanistan
"Wajah", a 2005 song by Jaclyn Victor

See also